Out of the Shadow is a 1919 American silent mystery film directed by Emil Chautard and starring Pauline Frederick.

Plot
As described in a film magazine review, Ruth Minchin is unhappily married to her father's business partner Gabriel, who is a drunken brute. She starts a friendship with Severino, a pianist who lives in the same apartment building. Her husband discovers them together, orders Severino from the room, and strikes his wife down. Severino kills Gabriel while in a delirium following pneumonia, and Ruth is suspected of the crime. She is befriended by Richard Steel, who knew her husband from their time in Australia. However, Richard is also suspected of the crime, and she cannot marry the man who may have killed her husband. She later recalls the confrontation when she had been with Severino, and under pressure the pianist confesses to the crime, solving the mystery and leaving Ruth Richard on the road to happiness.

Cast
Pauline Frederick - Ruth Minchin
Wyndham Standing - Richard Steel
Ronald Byram         - Edward Langholm
William J. Gross        -Reverend Woodgate
Emma Campbell - Mrs. Woodgate
Nancy Hathaway - Mrs. Vanables
Agnes Wakefield - Richard Steel's, aunt
Jack W. Johnston - Gabriel Minchin
Syn De Conde - Severino
William T. Hayes - ?

References

External links
 
allmovie/synopsis; Out of the Shadow
Film poster

1919 films
Lost American films
American silent feature films
Paramount Pictures films
American mystery films
American black-and-white films
1919 drama films
1910s American films
Silent mystery films